Dogwood Trace is a neighborhood in southwestern Lexington, Kentucky, United States. Its boundaries are South Elkhorn Creek to the north and east, Harrodsburg Road to the west, and the Jessamine County line to the south.

Neighborhood statistics
 Area: 
 Population: 744
 Population density: 3,364 people per square mile
 Median household income: $99,858

External links
 http://www.city-data.com/neighborhood/Dogwood-Trace-Lexington-KY.html

Neighborhoods in Lexington, Kentucky